The 2003 St Sampson by-election was held in the States of Guernsey district of St Sampson on 12 November 2003, following the death of deputy Peter Falla in August 2003. Sam Maindonald was elected as the new deputy.

Result

References

By-elections in Guernsey
St Sampson by-election
St Sampson by-election
St Sampson by-election